Flugrath is an unincorporated community in Blanco County, in the U.S. state of Texas. According to the Handbook of Texas, the community had a population of 20 in 2000.

History
Rock mason Gus Flugrath and his wife, Laura, owned and operated a cotton gin for local farmers sometime before 1915. He joined his brother, Albert, to build a grocery store a few years later. It became a popular gathering place. A dance hall was built around 1935 and hosted dancing for locals every month. The store continued to operate for many years and locals honored the Flugraths on their golden wedding anniversary in 1961. It then closed in the 1980s. Its population was 20 in 2000, with the store still standing and continued to appear on county maps.

Geography

Education
Flugrath is served by the Blanco Independent School District.

References

Unincorporated communities in Blanco County, Texas
Unincorporated communities in Texas